In mathematics, given two measurable spaces and measures on them, one can obtain a product measurable space and a product measure on that space. Conceptually, this is similar to defining the Cartesian product of sets and the product topology of two topological spaces, except that there can be many natural choices for the product measure.

Denote by   the sigma algebra on the Cartesian product   generated by subsets of the form  , where   and   This sigma algebra is called the tensor-product σ-algebra on the product space.

A product measure   
is defined to be a measure on the measurable space   satisfying the property

for all

.

(In multiplying measures, some of which are infinite, we define the product to be zero if any factor is zero.)

In fact, when the spaces are -finite, the product measure is uniquely defined, and for every measurable set E,

The existence of this measure is guaranteed by the Hahn–Kolmogorov theorem.

The Borel measures on the Euclidean space Rn can be obtained as the product of n copies of Borel measures on the real line R.

Even if the two factors of the product space are complete measure spaces, the product space may not be. Consequently, the completion procedure is needed to extend the Borel measure into the Lebesgue measure, or to extend the product of two Lebesgue measures to give the Lebesgue measure on the product space.

The opposite construction to the formation of the product of two measures is disintegration, which in some sense "splits" a given measure into a family of measures that can be integrated to give the original measure.

Examples

Given two measure spaces, there is always a unique maximal product measure μmax on their product, with the property that if μmax(A) is finite for some measurable set A, then μmax(A) = μ(A) for any product measure μ. In particular its value on any measurable set is at least that of any other product measure. This is the measure produced by the Carathéodory extension theorem.
Sometimes there is also a unique minimal product measure μmin, given by μmin(S) = supA⊂S, μmax(A) finite μmax(A), where A and S are assumed to be measurable.
Here is an example where a product has more than one product measure. Take the product X×Y, where X is the unit interval with Lebesgue measure, and Y is the unit interval with counting measure and all sets measurable. Then for the minimal product measure the measure of a set is the sum of the measures of its horizontal sections, while for the maximal product measure a set has measure infinity unless it is contained in the union of a countable number of sets of the form A×B, where either A has Lebesgue measure 0 or B is a single point. (In this case the measure may be finite or infinite.) In particular, the diagonal has measure 0 for the minimal product measure and measure infinity for the maximal product measure.

See also
 Fubini's theorem

References

 
 

Measures (measure theory)
Integral calculus